Crnovec (other name as Crneec) is a village in the municipality of Bitola, North Macedonia. It is located west of Macedonian Hwy P1305 (Demir Hisar-Bitola), in the valley of the Šemnica River, downstream from the Streževo Dam. It used to be part of the former municipality of Kukurečani.

Demographics

In the early 19th Century population of Crnovec are Tosks, a subgroup of southern Albanians.

In statistics gathered by Vasil Kanchov in 1900, the village of Crnovec was inhabited by 500 Muslim Albanians.

By then in 20th century Macedonians (ethnic group) population of Crnovec start to settled in the area.
In 1961 the village had 636 inhabitants. The inhabitants of the village are displaced in Bitola, Skopje, Europe, Australia and overseas countries.

According to the 2002 census, the village had a total of 86 inhabitants. Ethnic groups in the village include:
Macedonians 66 
Albanians 18
Turks 1
Others 1

References

Villages in Bitola Municipality